FC Margveti 2006 is a Georgian association football club from Zestafoni, which competes in Liga 4, the fourth division of Georgian football system.

History

Clubs of Zestafoni

Since 1990, when independent leagues were formed, the city of Zestafoni has been represented by several clubs in Georgian football divisions. 

● FC Margveti spent eight seasons in Umaglesi Liga in 1990s, twice reaching semifinals of the national Cup and once finishing the second, which paved the way for participation in UEFA Cup preliminary round. However, facing a severe financial crisis, the club went bust in 2000.

● Metalurgi, bearing the name of a Soviet-time football club from Zestafoni, re-emerged instead. Being participant of two top flight seasons between 2001 and 2003, they, too, ceased to exist for the same reason.  

● FC Zestafoni, founded in 2004, achieved a remarkable success in late 2000s and early 2010s, becoming a dominant force along with Dinamo Tbilisi. The two-times champions and the Cup title holders, however, due to various reasons faded away gradually after 2014.

Margveti 2006

Margveti 2006 were formed as a municipal club on the basis of a local football school, where at one point 268 pupils were engaged in football, participating in different regional and republican competitions. As for the professional club, they have taken part in the third division and below only. 

Margveti came close to gaining promotion to Pirveli Liga three times in four years in the middle of the decade. In 2016, they won the Group tournament, although no club was promoted in this season. 

In contrast with the previous seasons, in 2017 the club was involved in the relegation round. Although Margveti seemed clear favourites in a play-off tie, they surprisingly lost it, which led to the exit of manager Gia Guruli and 13 field players. The team was a member of  Regionuli Liga for the next three years before they managed to take the second place in 2020 in Group A West and advance to Liga 4.

Once there, the club competed in the first stage well enough to qualify for Promotion Group, where due to the financial crisis their performance sharply deteriorated.

Seasons

Honours
Meore Liga
Winners (1): 2016 (Group A West)
Runners-up (2): 2013-14, 2015-16 (West)

Players
As of April 2022

Stadium
Due to unavailability of a football ground in the city, the club hires a pitch in the neighbouring Kharagauli district. The construction of a municipal stadium, which was repeatedly announced, is yet to commence.

City derby
Relations with FC Zestafoni can hardly be described as easy. In 2015, a media row erupted after Ilia Kokaya, the owner of the latter, slammed Margveti 2006 for cronyism and unfair privileges, and suggested that the local authorities were deliberately seeking to sink FC Zestafoni at the expense of this municipal club. Margveti hit out at him by dismissing all the allegations.      

During the 2018, 2019 and 2021 seasons these two clubs played in the same division. Initially Margveti won two games (1-0 and 2-0), but then lost next seven matches in a row with a 4-35 aggregate goal difference.

Name
Margveti, also mentioned as Argveti in historic annals, was a duchy between VIII and XI centuries on large swaths of current Imereti region.

External links
Page on Facebook

On Soccerway

References

Association football clubs established in 2006
Margveti